Marmoricola silvestris is a Gram-positive bacterium from the genus Marmoricola which has been isolated from alpine forest soil.

References 

Propionibacteriales
Bacteria described in 2018